Andrew Checketts is an American college baseball coach and former player. He currently is the head coach of the UC Santa Barbara Gauchos.

Playing career 
Checketts graduated from West Linn High School in West Linn, Oregon and was named 1994 Oregon State High School Player of the Year.  He then played one season at Florida before transferring to Oregon State for his remaining three years.  In his final year with the Beavers, he posted an 11–1 record, earning conference and national honors and a 21st round selection by the Boston Red Sox in the 1998 Major League Baseball Draft.  He played briefly in the Red Sox system at the end of 1998, then played for the Independent Tri-City Posse for one season before turning to coaching.

Coaching career 
Checketts began coaching at Riverside Community College in 2001, serving as pitching coach and helping the team to their second state championship.  The next season, he moved across town to UC Riverside where he stayed for six seasons as pitching coach and later recruiting coordinator.  The Highlanders claimed their first Big West Conference championship in his final season and ranked highly in several national statistical pitching categories.  Checketts then moved to Oregon, which re-launched its program in 2008.  He served as pitching coach and was also instrumental in several strong recruiting classes for the Ducks.  In his time at UC Riverside and Oregon, Checketts had 36 pitchers drafted or sign pro contracts, including nine draft picks in three years at Oregon.

Following the 2011 season, Checketts was named as the ninth head coach in UC Santa Barbara history.  The Gauchos were coming off a sixth-place finish in the competitive Big West Conference and had not appeared in the NCAA tournament since 2001.  He claimed 28 wins in his first season, most in school history for a first year head coach, and his pitching staff set a school record for strikeouts.  UC Santa Barbara also led the league in batting for the first time since 1984.  In Checketts' first recruiting class he brought in Dillon Tate, who later became the 4th overall pick in the 2015 Major League Baseball draft.

Head coaching record 
Below is a table of Checketts's yearly records as an NCAA head baseball coach.

See also 
List of current NCAA Division I baseball coaches

References

External links 
 UC Santa Barbara coaching profile

Living people
People from West Linn, Oregon
Florida Gators baseball players
Oregon State Beavers baseball players
Riverside City Tigers baseball coaches
UC Riverside Highlanders baseball coaches
Oregon Ducks baseball coaches
UC Santa Barbara Gauchos baseball coaches
Place of birth missing (living people)
Sportspeople from the Portland metropolitan area
Gulf Coast Red Sox players
Tri-City Posse players
1975 births
Baseball players from Oregon
Baseball coaches from Oregon